The 2006 Minnesota Attorney General election was held on Tuesday, November 7, 2006 to elect the Minnesota Attorney General for a four-year term. DFL incumbent Mike Hatch chose to run for governor instead of reelection. Lori Swanson of the Minnesota Democratic–Farmer–Labor Party (DFL) won election to her first term.

Candidates

Democratic–Farmer–Labor Party 
Former deputy attorney general Lori Swanson won the DFL nomination.

State senator Steve Kelley, House Minority Leader Matt Entenza, and former U.S. Representative Bill Luther all ran unsuccessfully for the DFL nomination.

Republican Party 
State representative and assistant majority leader Jeff Johnson won the Republican nomination.

Independence Party 
Attorney and former revenue commissioner John James was the Independence Party nominee.

Green Party 
Musician Papa John Kolstad was the Green Party nominee.

Results

References 

Attorney General
Minnesota Attorney General elections
Minnesota